The Routing Policy Specification Language (RPSL) is a language commonly used by Internet Service Providers to describe their routing policies.

The routing policies are stored at various whois databases including RIPE, RADB and APNIC. ISPs (using automated tools) then generate router configuration files that match their business and technical policies.

RFC2622 describes RPSL, and replaced RIPE-181.

RFC2650 provides a reference tutorial to using RPSL in practice to support IPv6 routing policies.

RPSL Tools and Programs

 RtConfig - automatically generate router configuration files from RPSL registry entries (This software is part of the IRRToolSet)
 irrPT - Tools for ISPs to collect and use information from Internet Routing Registry (IRR) databases

External links
 RIPE RPSL page

Internet architecture
Routing